The Stewart Parker Trust Award or Stewart Parker Prize is an annual Irish award
for best Irish debut play. It is named in honour of Stewart Parker. There is a cash bursary as part of the award. Previous recipients of the award include: Gavin Kostick, Conor McPherson, Mark O'Rowe, Enda Walsh, Eugene O'Brien, Tom MacIntyre. Gerald Murphy, Nancy Harris, Gina Moxley, Lisa McGee and Christian O'Reilly.
The winners are announced annually at the Lyric Theatre.

References

Irish theatre awards
Irish literary awards